Warble Womb is the sixth studio album by American rock band Dead Meadow. It was released in November 2013 under Xemu Records.

Track listing

References

2013 albums
Dead Meadow albums
Xemu Records albums